Samakkhi Witthayakhom School (SWK), or formerly, Samakkhi Witthayakhom Chiang Rai Provincial School, is a public high school in Chiang Rai Province, the northernmost province of Thailand.

Established by Chiang Rai Governor Phraya Si Suriyaratchawaranuwat (Suk Ditsayabut) in 1908, it is the twenty-second oldest public high school of the country, the fourth oldest of the northern Thailand and the oldest in Chiang Rai Province. The school has celebrated its centenary in 2008.

The school is a state provincial agency with juristic personality, subsidiary to the Office of Chiang Rai Educational Area 1, the Office of Basic Education Commission, the Ministry of Education, respectively.

History
The school dates to 1908. Its name was shortened to "Samakkhi Witthayakhom", meaning the "academic institute established by unanimity". At that time, the school was housed in the foothills of Wat Ngam Mueang (Thai: วัดงำเมือง), and only grade 4 to grade 6 was offered, extended to grade 9 in 1917.

In 1924, due to site limitations, Chiang Rai Governor Phraya Ratchadetdamrong (Phon Sarutanon) (Thai: พระยาราชเดชดำรง (ผล ศรุตานนท์)) ordered that SWK classes be consolidated to grades 4–6 and grades 7–9. The younger grades moved to Wat Ming Mueang (Thai: วัดมิ่งเมือง) as an interim solution. Grades 7-9 were moved to Wat Chet Yot (th: วัดเจ็ดยอด). The governor also raised funds to establish permanent office space for school administration.

In 1927, CR educational officer Luang Kittiwat (Thai: หลวงกิตติวาท) granted governmental funds to the school to cover office construction costs. Grades 4–7 were pulled out of the school to become a new school entitled "Damrong Rat Songkhro School" (Thai: โรงเรียนดำรงราษฎร์สงเคราะห์). SWK extended its offerings to Grade 12. Owing to construction delays, SWK acting Director Khuang Sukhontharot (Thai: ข่วง สุคนธรส) and CR educational officer Boonsing Boonkham (Thai: บุญสิงห์ บุญค้ำ) disbursed 350 baht to purchase a six-rai estate at Wat San Pa Daeng (Thai: วัดสันป่าแดง) from the American missionary Ray W. Battelle, and further adjacent estates amounting to about one plaeng (Thai measurement unit). Land and money were donated to the school by the government, public servants, and aristocrats, including, among others, physician and former Minister of Public Health, Sem Phringphuangkaeo (Thai: เสม พริ้งพรวงแก้ว), and 600 million baht from the Council of Ministers.

A panel was set up by CR Administration to supervise construction, with Boonsing Boonkham as chair. The panel hired a Chinese construction company. On 2 March 1937, a ceremony was held to lay the cornerstone for the permanent office. On 11 February of the following year CR Governor Phra Phanom Nakharanurak (Hokkai Phisanlabut) (Thai: พระพนมนครานุรักษ์ (ฮกไก่ พิศาลบุตร)) presided over the inauguration of the main building.

Upon completion of construction, the Council of SWK Government Teachers resolved in 1940 to use the school flag and anthem. The abbreviation "SWK" and the motto  ("unity is strength") were also officially invented and declared. Following that, many buildings were installed at the school to serve public needs.

In 1993 female students were accepted by SWK for the first time. The Regional Scientific and Technological Education Centre was opened at the school. The Regional Arts Centre was also opened in 2002, followed by advent of the "English Programme" for grade 7–9, as well as Thailand's Self English Access Centre under the patronage of the World Bank, the "Buddhist School" Project, and the "Technological School" project.

Due to increases in enrolment the government announced, in 1994, the opening of a branch of SWK to be known as "Samakkhi Witthayakhom School 2".

The school celebrated its centennial in 2007. The celebration was held under the banner, "Uniting Hearts, Uniting Wills, the Centenary of Samakkhi Witthayakhom School 2008" (Thai: ร้อยใจ ร้อยไมตรี ๑๐๐ ปี สามัคคีวิทยาคม พ.ศ. ๒๕๕๑, RTGS: Roi chai roi maitri nueng roi pi samakkhi witthayakhom phoso song phan ha roi ha sip et). The highlight was the opening of the Centenary Building – established in May 2007, given the name "King's 80th Birthday Anniversary Commemorative Building" by Bhumibol Adulyadej — presided over by Maha Chakri Sirindhorn.

With the goal of educating scientists for Thailand's future, the school in 2008 initiated a new class for forty students selected from grade 10 science classes by examination. These students meet twice a week in a special laboratory to receive intensive training in mathematics, physical science, chemistry, biology, and computer science.

Symbols

The school motto is: Balaṃ saṅghassa sāmaggī (Pāḷī) or "Unity is strength",
its slogan is: "The finest education, the best comportment, and the most excellent development",
and its byword: "Good examples prevailing good instructions."

The school anthem is March of Samakkhi Witthayakhom, composed by the Council of Teaching Staffs of the school in 1940 for use in cheering sport competitions. The march lyrics invite people to come join the school's sport competitions, as well as call for unity and perseverance among the competitors.

Seal: The seal of the school is composed of a strand tightly roped in the figure of the abbreviated school title in Thai, "ส.ว.ค.", as a symbol of unity. Under the strand lie the clouds representing respectfulness. Upon the strand, there is the royal insignia with glorious light, as a sign of illumination. And beneath the strand is the establishment year in Buddhist Era and the ribbon with the school motto.

Buddha statue: "Phra Phutthamani Maitri Rattana" ("the jewel Buddha of precious friendship"). Formerly, it was untitled but called "Phra Phuttharup Chiang Saen Sing Sam" (th: พระพุทธรูปเชียงแสนสิงห์ 3, "Chiang Saen's Three Lions Buddhist Statue). On 1 July 2004, Somdet Phra Nyanasamvara, the Supreme Patriarch of Thailand) gave it its present name to celebrate the school's centenary in 2008. The statue is bronze, dating back around 400–500 years to the Chiang Saen period. Having a size identical to a mature child sitting in a meditative posture, its length is 17 inches. Three lions mentioned in the name are the artistic features of the statue: lion-like feature, divine-like feature, and Buddha-like feature. Presently, it is installed in Building 1's auditorium as the principal Buddha statue.

Campus

The school occupies five rai, five ngan, 200 square metres, consisting of 13 academic buildings, five minor buildings, 90 classrooms, and 45 academic laboratories. Academic buildings:

 Building 1:  Office of the Director, Office of Steering Affairs, Office of Student Affairs, Office of General Affairs. Office of Academic Affairs. Second floor, the honorary hall and the auditorium. It is the oldest building on campus, built in 1938. 
 Building 2: Department of Science, laboratories and the Library of the Scientific and Technological Education Advancement Centre.
 Building 3: Department of Vocational and Technological Education's Computer Division, and the Information and Communication Technology Centre.
 Building 4: Department of Thai Language and its library.
 Building 5: Department of Mathematics and math labs.
 Building 6: Charoenchai Library or the Central Library, Department of Social, Religious and Cultural Education, Department of Arts.
 Building 7: Grand Conference Hall, Department of the Foreign Languages. The central gymnasium and Thammasathan, the place for religious affairs, are nearby.
 Building 8: English Programme.
 Building 9: King's 80th Birthday Anniversary 5 December BE 2550 (2007) Commemorative Building.
 Building 11 Is a 4-story building architecture like building 9 There are built-in toilets and it was completed in early 2014. 
 Building 12 Is a 6-story building there are 2 elevators in the building and it was completed in early 2020. 

The school grounds host a botanical garden in honour of Princess Maha Chakri Sirindhorn. The garden contains indigenous plants. There are two canteens behind Building 9, one called the "Sinthani Canteen," the other one, "Canteen 2." Official residences are behind the canteens.

Behind the school are the Chiang Rai Vocational College and Chiang Rai Commercial College.

Education

Organisation

 The school provides basic secondary education (Grades 7–12, called in Thai "Matthayommasueksa (th: มัธยมศึกษา, secondary education)" 1–6) in conformity with Thailand's National Basic Curriculum. It arranges for supplementary programmes in addition.
 Grades 7–9 contain twelve classrooms each, 36 classrooms in all, which can be categorised as follows:
 Class 11–12: for gifted students under the "Programme on Education Arrangement for Science-and-mathematics Gifted Children" (th: โครงการจัดการศึกษาสำหรับผู้มีความสามารถพิเศษทางวิทยาศาสตร์และคณิตศาสตร์) offering a science and mathematics.
 Class 9–10: for English Programme's students. The students will have all subjects in English with the exception of the Thai language. The school employs qualified foreigners as instructors under this programme.
 Class 1–8 : for general students assuming the basic secondary education.
 Grades 10–12 contain fifteen classrooms each, being forty five classrooms in total, categorised as follows:
 English-Thai-Sociology Programme (Class 1)
 English-Chinese Programme (Class 2)
 English-Japanese Programme (Class 3)
 English-French Programme (Class 4)
 English-Mathematics Programme (Class 5-6)
 Science-Mathematics Programme (Class 7-15)
 Gifted Children Programme or the "Programme on Education Arrangement for Gifted Children in Thai Language Branch, Foreign Language Branch, Mathematics Branch and Science Branch" (th: โครงการจัดการศึกษาสำหรับผู้มีความสามารถพิเศษทางภาษาไทย ภาษาต่างประเทศ คณิตศาสตร์ และวิทยาศาสตร์) is an extra programme provided by the school. It is initiated by Thailand's National Education Council and, presently, supervised by Office of the Secretary General of the National Education Council (OSEC) incorporating Chiang Mai University's Faculty of Humanity. The process of the programme commences with the selection of gifted students in Grades 10–12 through requiring them to do the specific examinations, to be interviewed. The selected students will have extraordinary educations for the branch whereof. Students graduated under this programme will receive the certificates from OSEC. The chief objective of the programme is to provide education suitable to the student's capacity and to advance such capacity to be productive.
 Those having the chief duty of providing education are called "8-D" (eight departments), consisting of the following:

 Department of the Thai Language
 Department of Foreign Languages
 Department of Mathematics
 Department of Science
 Department of Social, Religious and Cultural Education
 Department of Physical Education
 Department of Arts
 Department of Vocational Technology
 Division of Agriculture
 Division of Domestic Education
 Division of Computer

Admissions

Grade 7 

Students admitted to this grade shall have completed Prathommasueksa 6 (th: ประถมศึกษาปีที่ 6 have a Grade 6 certificate or other certificate having the same level. Upon completion of the enrollment normally taken place from every year's February to March, selection of the applicants will be practiced through two means as follows:

1. Lot drawing Residents of Amphoe Mueang Chiang Rai enjoy the right to draw a lot whether they are admitted or not. Each applicant has right to draw only one lot. In each academic year the school will determine the number of admitted lots. The drawing is normally held at the beginning of April.

2. Testing The applicants—other than the persons having already passed the lot drawing—including the persons whom failed the lot drawing are required to engage in the educational tests in the subjects and at the time and place determined by the school. The tests are arranged and produced by the school in accordance with the standards determined by the Ministry of Education. For the exceptional classes (Class 9 to Class 12), the applicants who have passed the tests, and their guardian also, are further required to take part in interviews.

Grade 10 
A student in this grade will have completed Matthayommasueksa 3 (th: มัธยมศึกษาปีที่ 3, initial secondary education, or Grade 9) or possess another certificate proving the same level. Enrollment normally takes place every year in February to March. Placement of the students is achieved by various means as follows

1. For Class 8 to Class 15: There are tests which applicants must take. Tests are produced by the school in accordance with the standards determined by the Ministry of Education.

2. For school alumni: Applicants who are alumni of the school, i.e., have succeeded in grades 7-9 at the school, have the right to submit their grade point average to the committee(s) installed by the school to select in accordance with the rules and procedures stipulated by the school.

3. For general students: Applicants having succeeded elsewhere are required to take tests, but science and math are not emphasized

Each year there are a large number of applicants for both grade 7 and grade 10, up to more than 10,000, but the school can accept only 600 students for each grade.

Graduation 
The certificate of initial secondary education will be conferred on the graduates from grade 7 through 9, and the certificate of terminal secondary education to grades 10–12.

Awards
  1990 Royal Best Secondary School Award, granted by Bhumibol Adulyadej's daughter Maha Chakri Sirindhorn at Dusitalaya Hall, Chitralada Palace, Bangkok, 20 May 1991, for extensively pursuing the public advancement
 "Best Classroom Advancement School" Reward granted by CR Educational Office in 1996
 "Best School for Educational Reform" Reward from CR Governor in 2001
 "Best Curricular Arrangement School" Award from the Government in 2002
 "Best Buddhist Development and Support School" Award from the Office of National Buddhism in 2004
 "Example School for Democratic Development" Award from Privy Councillor Prof Kasem Watthanachai in 2005.

Administrators

Notable alumni 

 Nattakan Lonoppharat : teen idol
 Nichamon Ongkhasuwan : singer and musician
 Decha Bunkham, professor emeritus  : Landscape architect, National artist 2003
 Thawan Duchanee : Painter, National artist 2001
 Thanphisit Sotthisewi, Lieutenant : King's guard 
 Thitirat Rotsaengrat : CU Band singer, teen idol, teen star, singer
 Butsarin Tiyaphairat Woraphatthananan : Senator 
 Prasit Saenchai : Civil servant 
 Piya Techathirawat : Thammasat University lecturer
 Phairot Thammarot : Guitarist.
 Yongyut Tiyaphairat : House of Representatives member
 Yongyut Hongprayun, Pol Maj Gen : senior police officer
 Rueang Charoenchai : Southeast Asian Ministers of Education Organization's Regional Centre for Archaeology and Fine Arts director 
 Wiset Sisuwan : Ministerial adviser
 Sawanya Kaeomichai :  singer
 Sasinthon Insithon : teen idol
 Saowalak Duangsong : teen idol, teen star
 Jiradapa Intajak : BNK48 Member
 Zee Pruk Panich : Actor

Footnotes

References 

Printed materials
 Samakkhi Witthayakhom School.
 (1992). 1990 Best School Award Celebration Souvenir, February 14–15, 1992. Chiang Rai: Chiang Rai Advertisement and Printing House.
 (2003). Essential Projects, Academic Year 2003. (Copy).
 (2006). Student-Parent Manual. Lampang : Lampang Bannakit Printing House.

Articles
 Thawisak Phiphattanasak. (2009). "Editorial Notes". Boek Fa Banda Roa Magazine, (Volume 17).
 Nongnut Traisaeng.
 (2005).
 "Sous-Lieutenant Thanphisit Phongsai: Our Proud Alumnus". Boek Fa Banda Roa Magazine, (Volume 9).
 "Editorial Article : Nichamon Ongkhasuwam, National Best Pianist Champion". Boek Fa Banda Roa Magazine, (Volume 9).
 "White-Blue Relationship: Teacher Prasit Saenchai". Boek Fa Banda Roa Magazine, (Volume 9),
 "White-Blue Relationship: Introducing Parent-Teacher Association Chairperson". Boek Fa Banda Roa Magazine, (Volume 9).
 (2006).
 "From Senior to Junior : Drops of Experience". Boek Fa Banda Roa Magazine, (Volume 11).
 "Our Stories : Gifts for Junior". Boek Fa Banda Roa Magazine, (Volume 10).
 "White-Blue Relationship: Police Major General Yongyut Hongprayun, Our Proud Alumnus". Boek Fa Banda Roa Magazine, (Volume 10) .
 Samakkhi Witthayakhom School. (2009). "Our Proud Alumni". Boek Fa Banda Roa Magazine, (Volume 17).
 Suniphit Nanthachai. (2006). "From Senior to Junior : 'My Germany'”. Boek Fa Banda Roa Magazine, (Volume 11).
 Suphani Singpan. (2003). "The School that Promotes Gifted Students". Boek Fa Banda Roa Magazine, (Volume 5).

Online sources
 Basic Education Department. (n.d.). Research Outcome on Matthayommasueksa 1 and 4 student admission, Academic Year 1998. [Online]. Available: <link>. (Accessed: 25 January 2010).
 "History and Activity of Creating Sacred Objects in the Samakkhi Witthayakhom School's Centenary Celebration". (n.d.). [Online]. Available: <link>. (Accessed: 25 January 2010).
  Thaiblognews.com. [Online]. Available: <link>. (Accessed: 25 January 2010).
 Chiang Rai Focus [Online]. Available: <link>. (Accessed: 25 January 2010).
 Dr Ruang Chareonchai (n.d.). [Online]. Available: <link>. (Accessed: 25 January 2010).
 List of Samakkhi Witthayakhom School Administrators. (n.d.). [Online]. Available: <link>. (Accessed: 25 January 2010).
 Thai Rath.
 (2550, 13 January). Phanlop refusing relationship with bombers. [Online]. Available: <link>. (Accessed: 25 January 2010).
 (2551, 21 March). Student Admission Reduction [Online]. Available: <link>. (Accessed: 25 January 2010).
  'ETC' Boyband History  (n.d.). [Online]. Available: <link>. (Accessed: 25 January 2010).
 History of Samakkhi Witthayakhom School. (n.d.). [Online]. Available: <link>. (Accessed: 25 January 2010).
 Chiang Rai Education Development . (n.d.). [Online]. Available: <link>. (Accessed: 25 January 2010).
 Samakkhi Witthayakhom School. (n.d.). Student Admission, Academic Year 2010. [Online]. Available: <link>. (Accessed: 25 January 2010).
 Leosak Phunphiphat. (2551, 19 January). Daily Henchman. [Online]. Available: <link >. (Accessed: 25 January 2010).
 CU Band. (n.d.). CU Band Singers [Online]. Available : <link>. (Accessed: 25 January 2010).
 Web.chiangrai.net. (2006, 30 December). Role of Chairperson of Chiang Rai's League of 1st Educational Area Teachers. [Online]. Available: <link>. (Accessed: 25 January 2010).
 Office of the Council of State of Thailand. (2006, 14 July).  Government Teacher and Educational Personnel Act, BE 2547 (2004). [Online]. Available: <link>. (Accessed: 25 January 2010).
 Office of Basic Education Commission of Thailand. (2006, 18 December). Urgent Letter No. MOE 04009/13966 Re: Transfer and appointment of administrative teachers. [Online]. Available: link>. (Accessed: 25 January 2010).
 Office of Senatorial Secretary-General. (n.d.) Mrs Butsarin Tiyaphairat Woraphatthananan, Chiang Rai Senator.  [Online]. Available: <link>. (Accessed: 25 January 2010).
 Thaigifted.org. (n.d.). Network. [Online]. Available: <link>. (Accessed: 25 January 2010).
 "Talented Boys and Girls Contest, 2009". (2009, 26 November). Available: <link>. (Accessed: 25 January 2010).
 Aksorn.com. (n.d.). Basic Education Curriculum. [Online]. Available: <link>. (Accessed: 25 January 2010).
 INNnews.
 (2551, 2 March). Unofficial result of senatorial selection. [Online]. Available: <link>. (Accessed: 25 January 2010).

External links

 SWK's official website

Schools in Thailand
Buildings and structures in Chiang Rai province
Education in Chiang Rai province
Educational institutions established in 1908
1908 establishments in Siam